Lindsay Johnson (born 8 May 1980) is an English former footballer who played for Everton Ladies and the England women's national football team. Johnson was a fast and versatile defender, with the ability to play in any of the defensive positions.

Early life
Johnson was born in Hartlepool. She was educated at Fens Primary School, Manor College of Technology, and Hartlepool Sixth Form College. Her interest in sport in general began at a very early age. At the age of six years, she began athletics training, although was not allowed to compete until the age of eight years. She went on to represent her county at 200m and the long jump and also represented her county at hockey and netball.

Club career
Johnson's football career began at the age of 11 years when she joined a girls club. She also played for Coventry City on one or two occasions while attending Manchester Metropolitan University. However, her Premier League career began relatively late when she joined Liverpool Ladies, from where she joined Everton Ladies in 2003. Everton fans gave her the nickname "Lindsay Lightning" due to her pace. She played for Everton in their 1–0 FA Women's Cup Final defeat to Charlton Athletic Ladies in 2005, earning the Player of the Match award. She also played in Everton's League Cup win in 2008, beating Arsenal Ladies in the final.

Johnson's loyalty to Everton was rewarded with another two Cup finals in 2010: a 3–1 defeat by Leeds Carnegie in the Premier League Cup, in which Fara Williams scored Everton's consolation, followed by a memorable extra–time win over Arsenal in the FA Women's Cup.

When the 2014 season culminated in Everton's relegation, Johnson postponed her plans to retire and decided to play on for another season in FA WSL 2. In October 2015, she confirmed that Everton's match against Oxford United would be her last. Johnson marked the occasion with a goal in Everton's 5–3 win.

International career
Johnson represented England at Under-21 level, before making her senior debut against the Netherlands in September 2004. Her performances during the following season's Algarve Cup ensured a regular place in coach Hope Powell's England squad.

Although initially left out of the 2007 World Cup squad, she was included as a late replacement for Steph Houghton, who sustained a fractured fibula in training.

In May 2009, Johnson was one of the first 17 female players to be given central contracts by the Football Association. That August she was named in the squad for the Women's UEFA 2009, her versatility meaning she could provide cover for injury worries Alex Scott and Faye White. She replaced White in the first half of the quarter-final game against Finland and played all of the semi-final extra-time victory against the Netherlands

International goal
Scores and results list England's goal tally first.

Personal life

Johnson, a fan of Newcastle United, was a teacher of PE at The King's Academy, but gave up her teaching career to focus on her football career. She also works as a mentor and trainer for BTEC students studying fitness and sports development at Cardinal Heenan Sports College and as part of this is at the forefront of the SHAPE initiative that aims to promote health and physical activity among young children in central Liverpool.

She is related to Jenny Wilkes, also a footballer; who plays for Newcastle United Women and England at Junior level.

Honours

Club

Everton
FA Women's Cup: 2009–10
FA Women's Premier League Cup: 2007–08

International
England
Cyprus Cup: 2009

References

External links
Lindsay Johnson at The FA website
Lindsay Johnson at the Everton website

1980 births
Living people
Footballers from Hartlepool
English women's footballers
Liverpool F.C. Women players
Everton F.C. (women) players
England women's international footballers
FA Women's National League players
Women's Super League players
Coventry United W.F.C. players
England women's under-23 international footballers
Women's association football defenders
2007 FIFA Women's World Cup players